Tethys or Tethis may refer to:

 Tethys (database), an online knowledge management system about the environmental effects of offshore renewable energy
 Tethys (gastropod), genus of gastropods in the family Tethydidae
 Tethys (moon), a natural satellite of Saturn
 Tethys (mythology), a Titaness in Greek mythology
 Thetys (salp), a genus of gelatinous sea salp
 Tethys Ocean, a Mesozoic-era ocean between the continents of Gondwana and Laurasia
 Tethys Research Institute, a non-governmental scientific organisation based in Italy
 "Tethys", a song from The Ocean of the Sky by The Used
 Tethys, the Japanese name for "Thetis", a boss character in Mega Man ZX Advent
 Tethys River, an interplanetary waterway in Dan Simmons's Hyperion Cantos

See also
Thetis (disambiguation)